Nataša Janjić-Medančić (born 27 November 1981) is a Croatian film, stage and television actress.

Personal life
Nataša Janjić was born in Split on 27 November 1981. As a child, she studied at the Youth Theatre in Split. After finishing school in 2000, she went on to studying journalism and acting in Zagreb.

Janjić dated director Antonio Nuić before she began a relationship with Croatian actor and producer Joško Lokas in 2012, whom she married. The couple later divorced and Janjić married her second husband Nenad Medančić. Janjić and Medančić together have a son and a daughter.

Filmography

References

External links

1981 births
Living people
Actors from Split, Croatia
Croatian film actresses
Croatian television actresses
Croatian stage actresses
Golden Arena winners
Croatian LGBT rights activists
Croatian Theatre Award winners